MOSST Payments is an intrastate Ukrainian payment system (money transfer system).

General Information 
The National Bank of Ukraine registered MOSST Payments system in the «Register of Payment Systems, Settlement Systems, Participants in these Systems and Payment Service Infrastructure Operators» on June 16, 2015 (certificate No. 24). Payment organization of the payment system - LLC "FC" VAP-KAPITAL". Participants in the payment system - banks and non-bank financial institutions.

The personal data of system’s clients is protected in accordance with the PCI DSS bank card security standards.

The legal adviser of the system is LEMAN International Law Group.

The main products of the payment system are:
 MOSST — money transfer system;
 MOSST Reader - Service for accepting payment cards (in development); 
 MOSST Code — service for paying cash payments using a barcode (in development).

MOSST - money transfer system 
MOSST allows users to make money transfers between cards of any Ukrainian banks.

MOSST interface is simple and user-friendly, users can transfer money without pre-registration.

MOSST users can send money in four different ways:
 Using MOSST-tag (a unique user name in the system),
 Directly to another user's card,
 By e-mail address,
 By mobile phone number.

The last three options do not require registration. When money is sent to an email or mobile phone number, the recipient receives a unique code to finish transaction. Also, recipients themselves choose bank cards to receive transfers. That is, the sender does not even need to know the number of the recipient's bank card, which greatly simplifies the transfer process.

After sending the transfer, the recipient immediately receives a message stating that the money is already waiting for them.
MOSST Premium account users have access to additional features of the program: biometric face or fingerprint recognition on mobile devices, the history of transactions, saved receipts and bank cards, which allows to skip entering 16-digit bank card number and valid thru.

Users can use MOSST-money transfer application (available for download on Google Play and App Store) or a web version of the service.

References

External links 
 MOSST Payments Офіційний сайт  
 Money Transfer Service 
 
 

Payment systems
Banking in Ukraine